Al-badil (البديل) means The Alternative in Arabic, and is used in various contexts:

Al Badil Al Taharouri, a Lebanese anarchist organization
AGAS Anti Globalization Activists in Syria
The Al-Badeel Coalition, which seeks to provide Arab society with an alternative to the traditional code of honour.
Al-Badeel (Palestine), a joint list of leftist parties at the Palestinian legislative election, 2006